Southport Airport  is an airport located  northwest of Southport, in Coombabah, Queensland, Australia. It is operated by the Southport Flying Club.

Facilities
This is a private airport, and permission is required to land.

It has one runway measuring 778 metres. Both ends of the runway have displaced thresholds due to trees. Runway 01 has a displaced threshold of 190 metres and Runway 19 has a displaced threshold of 140M. As it is an uncontrolled aerodrome, pilots are required to coordinate arrivals and departures over a Common Traffic Advisory Frequency.

The displaced threshold lengths are:

Gallery

See also
 List of airports in Queensland

References

Airports in Queensland
Buildings and structures on the Gold Coast, Queensland
Southport, Queensland